The flag of the Cherkasy Region, Ukraine is the official flag of the Ukrainian province of Cherkasy. It was designed by Aleksandra and Mykolay Telizhenky, and officially adopted by the resolution of a regional council № 15-3 on January 29, 1998.

The flag is a rectangular panel, with a ratio of width to its length, 2:3. The larger half of it has a dark blue color, which one symbolizes a celestial altitude and advantage. The center of the flag features the oblast's coat of arms and the Ukrainian letters: Черкаська область. The top, right, and bottom edges of the flag have a yellow border.

References

  Flags of the World website - Cherkasy Oblast

Flags of Ukraine
Cherkasy Oblast
Flags introduced in 1998